Arcado is the debut album by the Arcado String Trio featuring violinist Mark Feldman, cellist Hank Roberts and bassist Mark Dresser, which was recorded in 1989 and released on the JMT label.

Reception
The AllMusic review by Ron Wynn called it an "Intriguing, sometimes explosive, string session".

Track listing
 "Gartman's" (Mark Dresser) - 11:37  
 "Griffin' Leroy" (Mark Dresser, Hank Roberts, Mark Feldman) - 0:22  
 "Subtonium # Three" (Dresser) - 12:19 
 "Kraine" (Dresser, Roberts, Feldman) - 0:29  
 "Living Bicycles" (Roberts) - 5:49  
 "Pastoral" (Dresser, Roberts, Feldman) - 0:47  
 "Curve Ball" (Dresser) - 12:07  
 "Ethel" (Dresser, Roberts, Feldman) - 0:30  
 "West Bank Cindy"(Roberts) - 7:04

Personnel
Mark Feldman - violin
Hank Roberts - cello
Mark Dresser - bass

References 

1989 albums
Mark Feldman albums
Hank Roberts albums
Mark Dresser albums
JMT Records albums
Winter & Winter Records albums